Kururamma (1570–1640 AD) was a devotee of Guruvayoorappan (Lord Krishna of Guruvayoor). Born in the village of Parur, near the abode of saint Vilwamangalam, as "Gauri", she received the name Kururamma since she was the senior-most woman of the Kurur Illam. Although she was a childless widow, Kururamma had the Lord as a child and used to treat Him like her very own. Kururamma feature in various legends associated with the Guruvayoor Temple.

17th-century Hindu religious leaders
Hindu female religious leaders
People from Guruvayur
Scholars from Kerala
Indian women scholars
17th-century Indian scholars
17th-century Indian women
17th-century Indian people
Women educators from Kerala
Educators from Kerala
1570 births
1640 deaths